Pompeo Ferrari (circa 1660 – 15 May 1736) was an Italian architect, known as the best Baroque artist of Greater Poland.

Biography

He studied in the leading art school of the era – Accademia di San Luca in Rome. After 1696, he lived in the court of the king Stanislaus I Leszczyński in Rydzyna. In 1703 he married Anna Rozyna Eitner, with whom he had several children.

Main works

 Leszno town hall (disputed) and tombs in the parish church
 Urban foundation of Rydzyna
 Ląd Abbey
 Basilica on the Holy Mountain near Gostyń 
 Teodor Potocki's chapel at the Cathedral in Gniezno 
 Fara Church in Poznań

Bibliography
Dalbor, Witold. 1938. Pompeo Ferrari ok. 1660-1736: działalność architektoniczna w Polsce. Warszawa: Kasa Mianowskiego.

1736 deaths
Polish Baroque architects
Italian Baroque architects
Year of birth uncertain